Dane Salmon, better known by his stage name Booba Starr, is a Jamaican reggae and dancehall singer and songwriter. He is a follower of the Rastafarian Faith.

Early life and career

Booba Starr was born Dane Salmon in Kingston, Jamaica. He spent is early childhood in kingston before his parents moved to the Greater Portmore area of Saint Catherine. Booba Starr's interest in music began while attending Kingston College High School. He began writing poems and songs during this high school days, and would perform them to entertain his family.

He would later hone his skills on a local sound system called Hard Drive, this experience gave him the confidence to pursue his musical interests. In 2010 he was introduced to the owner of Jafrika Records, Trevor 'TC' Clarke. His first song, "Things Changed" was produced by TC Clarke. A year later, Booba Starr invested in his own recording studio and began to record his own music, he did some work with the Austria based Lyrical Wars Records. Since opening his own recording studio he has voiced on riddims for multiple records labels and producers including: Julius "Zege" Mitchell of Sweatboxx Productions, Dimmie Joe Muzik & G5 Entertainment. He also recorded a single entitled "Hackle Di Body" for Jafrika label. Booba Starr is a tired less warrior who looks forward to a bright and promising future in the music industry as performer and producer. With his confidence, determination, and hard work, and guidance from Jah, Booba Starr will definitely be a major force in Reggae music for years to come.

References

Living people
Jamaican dancehall musicians
Jamaican reggae singers
Jamaican male singers
Musicians from Kingston, Jamaica
1988 births